Anchor Street is a village in Norfolk, England.

Villages in Norfolk
North Norfolk